Jung Hye-in (born September 20, 1990) is a South Korean actress. Jung is known for her support role in various television series such as Doctor Stranger (2014), Healer (2014–2015), Jugglers (2017), Graceful Family (2019),  and most recently in Sisyphus: The Myth (2021).

Filmography

Film

Television series

Web series

Television show

Music video appearances

Awards and nominations

References

External links
  

1990 births
Living people
South Korean film actresses
South Korean television actresses
21st-century South Korean actresses